Hauptmann Deutschland (German for Captain Germany), also known as Vormund, is a fictional character appearing in American comic books published by Marvel Comics.

Fictional character biography
Hauptmann Deutschland is part of a team called the Schutz Heiliggruppe, which was a national superteam protecting Germany. He first appeared in a backup story in Captain America where the Schutz Heiliggruppe captured the Red Skull and abducted him back to Germany in an attempt to put him on trial for war crimes. Although they captured the Skull and subsequently his Skeleton Crew, they later surrendered the Skull to a false Thor, Iron Man and Captain America, who were actually shapeshifting "bioplastoid" androids created by the Skull's lackey Arnim Zola.

Realizing the deception, Hauptmann Deutschland followed the Skull back to America. After a brawl with Captain America, the heroes teamed up to track the Skull. They concluded the hunt when confronted with a false corpse of the Red Skull. The false Skull had been shot through the head and appeared to have been killed by the Scourge of the Underworld, who left his trademark "Justice is Served" scrawled on the wall. 

Vormund's next appearance was in a somewhat convoluted tale where he set out with Zeitgeist, another member of the Schutz Heiliggruppe, in order to investigate the slaying of their partner Blitzkrieger, who had been slain while investigating the murders of multiple South American local superheroes. Although Vormund was framed for the murders, it was eventually discovered that Zeitgeist was actually a somewhat obscure American villain known as Everyman. While fleeing Captain America, Zeitgeist tried to stab Vormund with his sword. Vormund redirected the force of Zeitgeist/Everyman's stab and killed him.

Hauptman Deutschland is later seen aiding Blue Marvel against the organization The Terror-Hives of W.E.S.P.E.

Naming controversy
When the issues of Captain America containing Hauptmann Deutschland and the rest of the Schutz Heiliggruppe were to be published in Germany by licensee Condor Interpart, the names of the team were changed in accordance with the German taboos on references to Nazism, despite the team being distinctly anti-Nazi in behavior and the fact that Hauptmann Deutschland's name (literal translation: "Captain Germany") contains no actual reference to Nazism. In Germany, Hauptmann Deutschland was renamed Freiheitskämpfer (Freedom Fighter).

Due to a lack of coordination, when Hauptmann Deutschland next appeared in American comics, he was renamed Vormund, which means "legal guardian", "warden" or "custodian". Per Markus Raymond, a submitter to The Appendix to The Official Handbook of the Marvel Universe, Vormund actually should be used only in reference to a "legal guardian for a child or somebody else who can't talk legally for himself".

Powers and abilities
Hauptmann Deutschland has the power to absorb and redirect kinetic energy. He can project this energy into an opponent, use it to repel attacks, or increase his own strength and endurance. The origin of these powers is unknown. He is also a highly trained soldier and hand-to-hand combatant. He is also known to carry a variety of tactical gadgets in his belt, such as nets, oiled ball bearings, and a cable gun.

References

External links 

Fictional characters with energy-manipulation abilities
Fictional German people
Marvel Comics mutates
Marvel Comics superheroes
National personifications in comic books